Norman Mark Taylor (born 11 January 1951) is a former New Zealand rugby union player. A second five-eighth and wing, Taylor represented Bay of Plenty and Hawke's Bay at a provincial level, and was a member of the New Zealand national side, the All Blacks, between 1976 and 1982. His career in New Zealand was relatively short, playing 72 first-class domestic matches and 27 matches for New Zealand, including nine internationals.

Taylor also played in England for Wasps in the late 1970s and early 1980s, captaining the club in the 1980–81, 1981-82 and 1982–83 seasons, although he was ruled out of the final season by injury. In his first season as captain the Rothmans Rugby Yearbook stated that his "outspoken captaincy paid dividends for Wasps, who had their best season for twenty years". Taylor also played for the Middlesex county team and helped them reach the semi-final of the 1981-82 County Championship.

References

1951 births
Living people
People from Auckland
New Zealand rugby union players
New Zealand international rugby union players
Bay of Plenty rugby union players
Hawke's Bay rugby union players
Wasps RFC players
New Zealand expatriate rugby union players
New Zealand expatriate sportspeople in England
Expatriate rugby union players in England
Rugby union centres
Rugby union wings
People educated at Dargaville High School
Middlesex County RFU players